Colour Collection is a compilation album released in 2006 by German composer and singer Frank Duval.

Track listing
"Angel Of Mine"
"Face To The Wind"
"Give Me Your Love" 
"Ways"
"If I Could Fly Away"
"Living Like A Cry"
"Face To Face"
"Time For Lovers"
"Angel By My Side" 
"Cry For Our World"
"Living My Way"
"It Was Love"
"Lonesome Ways"
"Lovers Will Survive"
"Todesengel"

2006 compilation albums
Frank Duval albums
Albums produced by Frank Duval